Francis Wyndham (died 1592), of Norwich, Beeston and Pentney, Norfolk, was an English judge who once sat in parliament.

He was a Member of Parliament (MP) for Norfolk in 1572.

References

Year of birth missing
1592 deaths
People from Breckland District
Judges from Norwich
English MPs 1572–1583
People from King's Lynn and West Norfolk (district)
Serjeants-at-law (England)
Members of the Parliament of England for Norfolk
Politicians from Norwich